Priory Palace is an original palace in the formerly royal town of Gatchina (Гатчина), Leningrad oblast, Northwest Russia, a suburb of Saint Petersburg. It was built in 1799 by the architect N. A. Lvov on the shore of the Black Lake (Chyornoye ozero / Чёрное озеро).  Constructed for the Russian Grand Priory of the Order of St John, it was presented to the Order by a decree of Paul I of Russia dated August 23, 1799.

Features
The Priory is the only surviving architectural monument in Russia built mainly by the technology of earthwork: layers of compacted loam are poured with lime mortar. The walls of the palace, the fence, and the court buildings were built using this technology. The retaining wall is made of the famous Pudost stone, with which many of Gatchina's buildings were built.

The researchers note the precision of the layout of the Priory, the original composition, and the characteristic refusal of symmetry.

References

External links
 Gatchina Palace and Museum - official site including Priory Palace
 Priory - history, interiors, legends etc.
 

buildings and structures in Gatchina
castles in Russia
historic house museums in Russia
museums in Leningrad Oblast
palaces in Russia
rammed earth buildings and structures
Cultural heritage monuments of federal significance in Leningrad Oblast